Laila Hasan (born 1946) is a Bangladeshi choreographer, dancer and actress. She was awarded Ekushey Padak in 2010 for her contribution to art by the Government of Bangladesh.

Early life and education
Hasan was born in 1946. She completed her MA in philosophy from the University of Dhaka in 1970.

Career
Hasan got her dance lessons from Manibardhan Mahashay, Ajit Sanyal, Babu Ram Singh, GA Mannan and Shamar Bhattacharya of Bulbul Academy for Fine Arts (BAFA).

She was the presenter of the TV show Rumjhum on Bangladesh Television during 1980–85. Rumana Rashid Ishita, Tarin Jahan, Srabonti, Riya and Richi Solaiman were her students on the show.

Hasan has acted on theater, television plays and films. Her performances in productions like "Kankabotir Ghatey", Raktokarobi", "Chhuti", "Mayar Khela", "Raja Rani", "Tasher Desh", "Swargo Hotey Bidaye", "Shyamol Matir Dhoratoley", "Neel Darpan", "Dutta", "Keranir Jiban", "Taming of the Shrew" and "Nakshi Kanthar Math". Her TV plays include "Mon Poboner Nao","Kajol Rekha", "Bhelua Shundari", "Mahua", "Rani Bhabanir Path", "Ratnadwip" and "Pashapashi" and "Ashcharjo Ek Raater Galpo". Her acted films are 'Gharey Bairey', 'Feluda' (2007), 'Tintoretto-er Jishu' and 'Ei Tho Prem' and 'Moner Manush'.

She founded the dance organization named 'Nataraj' in 1990. And in 1996 Nataraj started theatre, stage drama with Nayeem Hasan Suja. Laila Hasan work in Nataraj as the President and Nayeem Hasan Suja is the Secretary General. Laila Hasan is a lifetime member of Bangla Academy and West Bengal Dance Federation. She is also a member of Asiatic Society and President of Bangladesh Nritya Shilpi Shangstha.

Hasan has published two books Hridoye Bajey Nupur (1996) on dance and "Mohonrupey" on aesthetics.

Personal life
Hasan is married to actor Hasan Imam. Hasan has six siblings. One sister, Daisy Ahmed, is an actress.

Awards
 BACHSHASH Award (2001)
 Kazi Mahbub Ullah Begum Zebunnessa Trust Award (2001)
 Ekushey Padak (2010)

References

1946 births
Living people
Bangladeshi female dancers
University of Dhaka alumni
Bangladeshi television actresses
Bangladeshi film actresses
Bangladeshi stage actresses
Recipients of the Ekushey Padak
Honorary Fellows of Bangla Academy
Place of birth missing (living people)
Bangladeshi choreographers